Volodymyr Yaniv (born 21 November 1908 in Lviv, Galicia – 19 November 1991) was a community and scouting leader in the 1930s, an activist in the OUN and the Ukrainian Military Organization (UVO), editor of numerous student and community publications, a professional psychologist and sociologist, and a Ukrainian poet.

Yaniv completed his gymnasium studies in Lviv in 1928 and further studied history and psychology at the Lviv University. After incarceration at the Bereza Kartuska concentration camp he completed his studies in Berlin with a dissertation on "The psychological changes of political prisoners". In 1946 he moved to Munich where took an active part in the life of the Ukrainian Free University. Yaniv wrote numerous works studying the effect of incarceration on the works of notable Ukrainian cultural figures such as Taras Shevchenko, Ivan Franko, Lesia Ukrainka, Vasyl Symonenko, Ihor Kalynets.

Plast

In his youth, in 1927-32, Yaniv took an interest in the Plast Ukrainian scouting movement, in which he held various leadership roles. He returned to scouting in 1946 and continued to be active in Ukrainian scouting to the end of his life.

Incarceration

Yaniv was first arrested by the Polish police for a period of two years in 1934-35 at the Bereza Kartuska concentration camp. In 1936 he was once again arrested and given a 5-year term before being released in 1938. In July 1941 he was arrested by the Germans and confined in Krakow for membership in the Ukrainian National Committee, established on 21 June 1941. His prison experiences became the basis for his dissertation and many of the books  and studies he published in later years.

His poems
Battle of Kruty

The golden blaze has lighten up,
The world has shuddered from sound of trumpets,
The glory widely could be heard
That has arisen for us our country
And Ukraine has stepped out of jails.

The wounds of hundred years has healed
As no more horror was there present
Of tyrants that laid in dew
Our heavy shackles has been torn
And the path into the future has cleared up...

For further reading refer here.

Awards
 Commander of the Order of St. Gregory the Great.

Sources
 Encyclopedia of Ukraine (in Ukrainian), vol. 10,  p. 3,973.
 The collection of the Ukrainian songs 

1908 births
1991 deaths
Writers from Lviv
Ukrainian Austro-Hungarians
People from the Kingdom of Galicia and Lodomeria
Eastern Catholic poets
Ukrainian Eastern Catholics
Ukrainian poets
Ukrainian refugees
Ukrainian politicians before 1991
Organization of Ukrainian Nationalists politicians
Members of the Shevchenko Scientific Society
Ukrainian nationalists
Inmates of Bereza Kartuska Prison